Kováň is a municipality and village in Mladá Boleslav District in the Central Bohemian Region of the Czech Republic. It has about 200 inhabitants.

Geography
It lies in the Jizera Table.

History
The first written mention of Kováň is from 1219.

Economy
Kováň is known for the Podkováň brewery. The brewery was founded in 1434.

Sights
The landmark of Kováň is the Church of Saint Francis of Assisi. It was built in the Baroque style around 1750.

References

External links

Villages in Mladá Boleslav District